Julija Stepanenko (born Julija Fedotova on 1 September 1977) is a Latvian politician and lawyer, serving as a deputy of the Saeima, the parliament of Latvia. Formerly a member of Honor to serve Riga and Law and Order, she is now a member of Latvia First, having left Law and Order in June 2021.

Political activity 
Stepanenko firstly was elected to Saeima In 2014. She served on the Saeima European Affairs Committee. 

Stepanenko received more than 12 000 pluses and more than 90 000 votes at the 2018 Latvian parliamentary election and became one of the most supported representatives of the 13th Saeima.  On the first day of the sitting of the 13th Saeima Stepanenko announced she would be leaving the Harmony parliamentary fraction and working as an independent deputy, however, she stated that she would continue to work with the party in matters that do not conflict with her own values. Stepanenko started serving in the Legal, European Affairs and Sustainable Development committees.

In January 2021 she co-founded the right-wing populist Law and Order party and was chosen to co-lead the party alongside fellow MP Aldis Gobzems until she left the party on 30 June 2021, criticising Gobzems' offensive style of communication. In August 2021 she was among the co-founders of the Latvia First party, being chosen as the party's board chair as well as their candidate for President of Latvia.

From 15 November 2021, Julija Stepanenko was one of the four Saeima deputies to be barred from parliament sittings by a special law prohibiting elected representatives without a COVID-19 certificate to take part in the discussion both in-person and remotely. She believed that this decision of the parliamentary majority is deeply undemocratic and shows that under the banner of fighting against COVID-19 things have gone thoroughly astray.

References

External links

Stepanenko's personal website

1977 births
Living people
Politicians from Riga
21st-century Latvian women politicians
Honor to serve Riga politicians
Deputies of the 12th Saeima
Deputies of the 13th Saeima
Women deputies of the Saeima
Latvian people of Russian descent
Latvia First politicians